Perchloric acid is a mineral acid with the formula HClO4. Usually found as an aqueous solution, this colorless compound is a stronger acid than sulfuric acid, nitric acid and hydrochloric acid. It is a powerful oxidizer when hot, but aqueous solutions up to approximately 70% by weight at room temperature are generally safe, only showing strong acid features and no oxidizing properties. Perchloric acid is useful for preparing perchlorate salts, especially ammonium perchlorate, an important rocket fuel component. Perchloric acid is dangerously corrosive and readily forms potentially explosive mixtures.

History
Perchloric acid was first synthesized (together with potassium perchlorate) by Austrian chemist  and called "oxygenated chloric acid" in mid-1810s; French pharmacist Georges-Simon Serullas introduced the modern designation along with discovering its solid monohydrate (which he, however, mistook for an anhydride).

Production
Perchloric acid is produced industrially by two routes. The traditional method exploits the high aqueous solubility of sodium perchlorate (209 g/100 mL of water at room temperature). Treatment of such solutions with hydrochloric acid gives perchloric acid, precipitating solid sodium chloride:
NaClO4 + HCl → NaCl + HClO4
The concentrated acid can be purified by distillation. The alternative route, which is more direct and avoids salts, entails anodic oxidation of aqueous chlorine at a platinum electrode.

Laboratory preparations
Treatment of barium perchlorate with sulfuric acid precipitates barium sulfate, leaving perchloric acid. It can also be made by mixing nitric acid with ammonium perchlorate and boiling while adding hydrochloric acid. The reaction gives nitrous oxide and perchloric acid due to a concurrent reaction involving the ammonium ion and can be concentrated and purified significantly by boiling off the remaining nitric and hydrochloric acids.

Properties
Anhydrous perchloric acid is an unstable oily liquid at room temperature. It forms at least five hydrates, several of which have been characterized crystallographically. These solids consist of the perchlorate anion linked via hydrogen bonds to H2O and H3O+ centers. An example is hydronium perchlorate. Perchloric acid forms an azeotrope with water, consisting of about 72.5% perchloric acid. This form of the acid is stable indefinitely and is commercially available. Such solutions are hygroscopic. Thus, if left open to the air, concentrated perchloric acid dilutes itself by absorbing water from the air.

Dehydration of perchloric acid gives the anhydride dichlorine heptoxide:
2 HClO4 + P4O10 → Cl2O7 + H2P4O11

Uses
Perchloric acid is mainly produced as a precursor to ammonium perchlorate, which is used in rocket fuel. The growth in rocketry has led to increased production of perchloric acid. Several million kilograms are produced annually. Perchloric acid is one of the most proven materials for etching of liquid crystal displays and critical electronics applications as well as ore extraction and has unique properties in analytical chemistry. Additionally it is a useful component in etching of chrome.

As an acid
Perchloric acid, a superacid, is one of the strongest Brønsted–Lowry acids. That its pKa is lower than −9 is evidenced by the fact that its monohydrate contains discrete hydronium ions and can be isolated as a stable, crystalline solid, formulated as [H3O+][]. It provides strong acidity with minimal interference because perchlorate is weakly nucleophilic (explaining the high acidity of HClO4). Other acids of noncoordinating anions, such as fluoroboric acid and hexafluorophosphoric acid are susceptible to hydrolysis, whereas perchloric acid is not. Despite hazards associated with the explosiveness of its salts, the acid is often preferred in certain syntheses. For similar reasons, it is a useful eluent in ion-exchange chromatography.

It is also used for electropolishing or etching of aluminium, molybdenum, and other metals.

Safety
Given its strong oxidizing properties, perchloric acid is subject to extensive regulations as it can react violently with metals and flammable substances such as wood, plastics, and oils. Work conducted with perchloric acid must be conducted in fume hoods with a wash-down capability to prevent accumulation of oxidisers in the ductwork.

On February 20, 1947 in Los Angeles, California, 17 people were killed and 150 injured in the O'Connor Plating Works disaster. A bath, consisting of over 1000 litres of 75% perchloric acid and 25% acetic anhydride by volume which was being used to electro-polish aluminium furniture, exploded. Organic compounds were added to the overheating bath when an iron rack was replaced with one coated with cellulose acetobutyrate (Tenit-2 plastic). A few minutes later the bath exploded. The O'Connor Electro-Plating plant, 25 other buildings, and 40 automobiles were destroyed, and 250 nearby homes were damaged.

See also
Chloric acid
Oxidizing acid

References

External links
International Chemical Safety Card 1006

Halogen oxoacids
Hydrogen compounds
Mineral acids
Oxidizing acids
Oxidizing agents
Superacids